María Gimena de los Milagros Accardi (born 27 May 1985), better known as Gimena Accardi, is an Argentinian actress.

Biography 
María Gimena de los Milagros Accardi was born on May 27, 1985, in Buenos Aires, Federal District, Argentina.

Career 
At age 10, Accardi began studying theater with teachers Stella Maris Closas, Patricia Palmer, and Raúl Serrano. She was cast in a television pilot, Cosa de chicos from producer Quique Estevanez, which never made it to air. However, Estevanez then cast her as Jessica, the sister of "Beto" Santana in Los buscas de siempre from Azul Televisión. Next, she was cast as Sofía, a teenager struggling with drug addiction, on PH by Azul Televisión.

In 2002, she played Catalina in Maridos a domicilio by Azul Televisión. This program was only on the air a short time, after which Accardi was cast as Melina in Los simuladores and Josefina in Kachorra, both by Telefe, as well as playing Sabrina on the second season of Rebelde Way by América TV.

In 2003, film director Teresa Constantini cast Accardi as Lucila in the unitary program Ensayo: Habitación 306. A year later, in 2004, she played Jazmín in the comedy  Panadería los Felipe by Telefe. In February 2005, when she was about to begin the second season of Panadería los Felipe, she was cast as Tatiana in the soap opera Amor en Custodia by Telefe. After finishing this program in 2006, she was cast in a feature film which was postponed due to lack of funding. The film, Cartas para Jenny, was eventually shot in 2007 in San Luis Province and then in Israel.

That same year, Accardi played Malvina, one of the villains of Casi Ángeles by Telefe. In 2009, she played the antagonist in the film Papá por un día with Nicolás Cabré and Luisana Lopilato. Then, in 2011, Accardi became part of one of the most successful telenovelas of that year, 
Herederos de una venganza, in which she played China Villegas. In 2012, she played Dolores in the second season of Los únicos, following that role up with another antagonist in the telenovela of Pol-ka, Sos mi hombre. 

In 2013 she joined the cast of Solamente vos In 2015 she got a lead role in Milagros en campaña and also participated in Conflictos modernos. In 2016, Accardi starred in the musical El otro lado de la cama and served as a judge on Canta si puedes. In 2018, she was cast as Lara and Patricia in Mi hermano es un clon.

Personal life 
On December 7, 2016, she married her partner of 9 years, Nicolás Vázquez, in a beach wedding.

Accardi and Vázquez survived the Champlain Towers South collapse on June 24, 2021. They were in Miami for work and to meet with Argentine comedian Martín Bossi, returning to their condo just as it began to experience the collapse. Accardi suffered a blow to the head when she ran into a palm tree during the mass exodus from the building, but both she and Vázquez were otherwise unharmed.

Filmography

Television

Movies

Theater

Videoclips

Television programs

Awards and nominations

Discography 
 2007 — Casi Ángeles

References

External links 
 
 Gimena Accardi at cinenacional.com

1985 births
Living people
Argentine female models
21st-century Argentine women singers
Argentine film actresses
Argentine television actresses
Argentine people of Italian descent
Actresses from Buenos Aires
21st-century Argentine actresses